Can You Feel It Baby is the debut EP album by Australian band Sherbet, released in September 1971.

The EP includes the single "Can You Feel It, Baby?", which was released in June 1971 and peaked at number 16 on the Kent Music Report.

Track listing

Personnel 
 Denis Loughlin – lead vocals
 Daryl Braithwaite – lead vocals
 Bruce Worrall – bass
 Tony Mitchell – bass
 Sam See – keyboards, vocals
 Garth Porter – keyboards, vocals
 Clive Shakespeare – guitar, vocals
 Alan Sandow – drums

References 

Sherbet (band) albums
1971 debut EPs
Festival Records albums
EPs by Australian artists
Albums produced by Pat Aulton